The College of Emporia Football Team was a college football team at the College of Emporia in Emporia, Kansas.  The team competed from 1893 until the college closed in 1974 and was known for its high quality play for the size of the school as well as its early adoption of modern football methods.

The final coach of the program was Dan Taylor.

Innovative play
The team was one of the earliest schools to regularly call the forward pass and the option pass under head coach Bill Hargiss and quarterback Arthur Schabinger.  The school was using the forward pass as a regular play three years before Knute Rockne and Notre Dame Football.

The program would regularly play games against much larger programs.  In 1921, the tema competed to a 7-7 tie against Oklahoma State and managed a lifetime record of 22 wins, 20 losses, and 2 ties against Emporia State--although ESU records dispute that claim and show the all-time record as 21-21-2.

The 1930 Thanksgiving Day game against Emporia State (called "Kansas Normal" at the time) resulted in tragedy when freshman George Day suffered a head injury during a punt return five minutes into the game.  He was treated quickly and taken to Newman Hospital for surgery, but he died that evening.

Conference play and season successes

Kansas Collegiate Athletic Conference
The team competed in the Kansas Collegiate Athletic Conference from 1933 until 1970.  The program was known for success among the small colleges which included three consecutive undefeated regular seasons (1953–1955) under head coach Wayne J. McConnell and two back-to-back undefeated seasons (1962–1963) under coach Bill Schnebel.  Both coaches were recognized as Little All-American Coach of the Year.

Championships

Table data source

Bowl games
The school also played in the 1954 Mineral Water Bowl, losing 20–14 to Hastings College, and then returned in 1959 to defeat Austin College by a score of 21–20.

Notable people
Coaches
Football coaches - Horace Botsford, Henry Brock, Harold Grant, Homer Hargiss, Lem Harkey, Gwinn Henry, Steve Kazor, Wayne McConnell, Walt Newland, Bill Schnebel, Lester Selves, Tom Stromgren

Players
A number of player from the College of Emporia went on to play in sports:
 Jim Jaquith played professional baseball in 1926  and also played for the Kansas City Cowboys.
 Lem Harkey was drafted by the Pittsburgh Steelers in 1955 and ended up playing for the San Francisco 49ers for one year.
 Bill Danenhauer (graduated 1956)  NAIA Football All-Amerian.  Baltimore Colts, Denver Broncos and Boston Patriots

See also
 Timeline of college football in Kansas

References